Khanileh may refer to:
 Khanileh, Kermanshah